The 2009 Pittsburgh Steelers season was the franchise's 77th season in the National Football League (NFL).  They were coming off a season in which they compiled a 12–4 regular season record and capped the season by winning the franchise's record sixth Super Bowl. The team's coaching staff remained the same for the third consecutive year.

As the defending champions, the Steelers opened the season by hosting the NFL Kickoff Game on Thursday, September 10, 2009, which was an overtime victory against the Tennessee Titans.  The team compiled a 6–2 record over the season's first half, but then began a five-game losing streak which included losses to all three division opponents.  Three late wins led to a 9–7 record, but the team failed to qualify for the playoffs.  This was the third straight time the team has missed the playoffs following a Super Bowl victory; 1980 and 2006 being the previous two.

The last remaining active member of the 2009 Pittsburgh Steelers was quarterback Ben Roethlisberger, who retired after the 2021 season.

Personnel

Staff

Training camp

Roster

Off season activity

The front office's major goals coming into the off-season were to retain the bulk of the team's own free agents and to look to add talent primarily through the draft rather than free agent acquisitions. This has been the team's primary philosophy since Chuck Noll took over as head coach in 1969. The other major item on the team's agenda was to extend the contracts of a few of the players who were coming into the final year of their contracts – chief among these were linebacker and 2008 NFL Defensive Player of the Year, James Harrison, tight end Heath Miller, and tackle Max Starks.

Management completed the highest-priority item on its off-season checklist by reaching agreement with Harrison on a six-year, $51.175 million contract, which includes $20 million in guaranteed money.  The team was also successful in extending the contracts of Starks (four years, $26.3 million) and Miller (six years, $35.3 million) both of whom were potential free agents after the season.  Additionally, contract extension were completed with receiver Hines Ward (five years, $22.1 million), guard Chris Kemoeatu (five years, $20 million), center Justin Hartwig (4 years, $10 million) and defensive end Brett Keisel (5 years, $18.885 million).

The team's primary needs coming into the 2009 season were considered to be shoring up the offensive line and improving performance on special teams, primarily at kick returner.  In addition, they were forced to address the loss through free agency of two key contributors: starting cornerback Bryant McFadden and number three wide receiver Nate Washington.  The front office and coaching staff also had to focus on uncovering for eventual replacements for some aging cogs: defensive end Aaron Smith and cornerback Deshea Townsend, who were 33 and 34 respectively at the start of the season.  ESPN's Matt Williamson ranked the team's pre-draft needs as (in order), defensive end, offensive tackle, wide receiver and cornerback.

Free agents signed
Players from the 2008 team who have signed new contracts with the Steelers:
 OT Max Starks – signed $26.3 million, four-year contract,
 G Chris Kemoeatu – signed five year, $20+ million contract
 OT Willie Colon – signed one year, $2.198 million restricted free agent tender
 OT Trai Essex – signed two year, $1.92 million contract
 LB Keyaron Fox – signed two year, $1.8 million contract
 FB/TE Sean McHugh – signed three year, $2.57 million contract, expected to be starting FB – placed on Injured Reserve on September 5, 2009
 QB Charlie Batch – signed one year, $795,000 contract
 LB Andre Frazier – signed two year, $1.375 million contract
 FB Carey Davis – signed exclusive rights free agent tender, which amounts to a one-year, $460,000 contract
 LB Arnold Harrison – signed one year, $460,000 contract

Players not with the 2008 team who have been signed for 2009
 CB Keiwan Ratliff – from Indianapolis Colts; Ike Taylor's contract was restructured to clear cap space
 RB Stefan Logan – from CFL's BC Lions
 WR Shaun McDonald – spent 2007 & 2008 with Detroit Lions

Players who signed with the team in 2009, but did not make the 53-man roster
 K Piotr Czech – attended training camp with the Baltimore Ravens in 2008 – released on September 5, 2009, in final cut-down to 53-man roster
 WR Martin Nance – 2008 Steelers practice squad player; signed two year, $705,000 contract – released on August 31, 2009, in cut-down to 75-man roster
 P Dirk Johnson – released by the Washington Redskins in 2009 – released June 12, 2009
 FB Ryan Powdrell – spent a week on the Bucs practice squad in 2008 – released June 18, 2009
 WR/KR Jayson Foster – spent 2008 on Steelers' and Denver Broncos' practice squads – released June 18, 2009
 WR Brandon Williams – released by Rams prior to 2008 season – released on September 5, 2009, in final cut-down to 53-man roster

Practice squad players
2008 practice squad players who made 2009 53-man roster:
 C Doug Legursky – 2008 Steelers practice squad player
 S Ryan Mundy – 2008 Steelers practice squad player, signed reserve/futures contract

2008 practice squad players who signed new reserve contracts, but didn't make final 53-man roster:
 DE Jordan Reffett – 2008 Steelers practice squad player, signed reserve/futures contract
 RB Justin Vincent – 2008 Steelers practice squad player, signed reserve/futures contract – released on September 5, 2009, in final cut-down to 53-man roster
 TE Dezmond Sherrod – 2008 Steelers practice squad player, signed reserve/futures contract – released on September 5, 2009, in final cut-down to 53-man roster
 CB Roy Lewis – 2008 Steelers practice squad player, signed reserve/futures contract – released on September 5, 2009, in final cut-down to 53-man roster
 WR Dallas Baker – 2008 Steelers practice squad player, signed reserve/futures contract – released on September 5, 2009, in final cut-down to 53-man roster
 LB Donovan Woods – 2008 Steelers practice squad player, signed reserve/futures contract – released on September 5, 2009, in final cut-down to 53-man roster

Players lost
 OG Kendall Simmons – released; 2002 first round pick; ended 2008 season on IR
 LB Mike Humpal – released; 2008 sixth round pick; ended 2008 on IR
 WR Nate Washington – 2005 undrafted free agent; signed with the Tennessee Titans as an unrestricted free agent
 FS Anthony Smith – 2006 3rd round pick; signed with Green Bay Packers as an unrestricted free agent
 CB Bryant McFadden – 2005 2nd round pick; signed with the Arizona Cardinals as an unrestricted free agent
 OT Marvel Smith – 2000 2nd round pick who started 108 games as a Steeler; signed with San Francisco 49ers
 QB Byron Leftwich – Steelers 2008 back-up QB; signed with Tampa Bay Buccaneers
 RB Gary Russell – released; 2007 undrafted rookie free agent, scored first touchdown of Super Bowl XLIII; signed with Oakland Raiders.
 LB Larry Foote – released; 2002 2nd round pick who started 83 games as a Steeler, including all 80 over the past five seasons; signed with Detroit Lions.
 LS Jared Retkofsky – released; signed last season when veteran long snapper Greg Warren tore his ACL
 CB Fernando Bryant – signed one year, $745,000 contract – Retired June 23, 2009
 OT Jeremy Parquet (exclusive rights free agent) – released on September 5, 2009, in final cut-down to 53-man roster
 P  Mitch Berger – made superfluous by return from injury of Daniel Sepulveda
 TE Jonathan Dekker – not invited to training camp
 DE Orpheus Roye – not invited to training camp
 CB Anthony Madison signed one year, $1.01 million restricted free agent tender – released on September 5, 2009, in final cut-down to 53-man roster

2009 NFL Draft

The 2009 NFL Draft was held on April 25 and 26, 2009, at Radio City Music Hall in New York City. In addition to their own draft picks, the team also had the Tampa Bay Buccaneers seventh-round selection (#226 overall) which they received in a trade prior to the 2008 season for offensive lineman Sean Mahan  and a compensatory pick at the end of the 5th round.

During the draft, the Steelers traded their second-round (#64 overall) and fourth-round (#132) picks to the Denver Broncos in exchange for Denver's third-round (#79) and Chicago's third-round (#84) picks.

Schedule

Preseason 
The Steelers opened their preseason schedule on August 13 with a re-match of Super Bowl XLIII against the Arizona Cardinals on Monday Night Football.

Regular season
The Steelers' opponents for the 2009 season are based on the NFL's predetermined scheduling formula.  The combined 2008 record of the Steelers' 2009 opponents was 110–144–2 (.434 winning percentage).  By this measure the Steelers have the fourth easiest schedule in the league – only the Packers, Vikings and Bears opponents have a worse cumulative 2008 winning percentage. The Packers, Vikings and Bears play two games each against the Lions, who finished 0–16 in 2008.

As the defending Super Bowl champion, the Steelers hosted the kickoff game for the 2009 season on Thursday, September 10, at 8:30 p.m. EDT.  Their opponent for the kickoff game was the Tennessee Titans.

The Pittsburgh Steelers won the first game of the 2009 season in overtime over the Tennessee Titans on September 10, 2009 at 11:48 pm EDT with a field goal.

Note: Intra-divisional opponents are in bold text.

Standings
The 2009 season was the Steelers' eighth as members of the AFC North Division.

Preseason results

Week 1: vs. Arizona Cardinals

Week 2: at Washington Redskins

Week 3: vs. Buffalo Bills

Week 4: at Carolina Panthers

Regular season results

Week 1: vs. Tennessee Titans
NFL Kickoff game

With their Super Bowl title to defend, the Steelers began their season at home in the annual kickoff game against the Tennessee Titans.  After a scoreless first quarter, Pittsburgh would get their first score of the season as quarterback Ben Roethlisberger completed a 34-yard touchdown pass to Super Bowl XLIII MVP wide receiver Santonio Holmes near the end of the second quarter.  The Titans would respond with quarterback Kerry Collins completing a 14-yard touchdown pass to wide receiver Justin Gage.  Just prior to halftime, pro-bowl safety Troy Polamalu went to the locker room after suffering a knee injury.  He would not return to the field and it would later be revealed that he strained his MCL.

After a scoreless third quarter, Tennessee would take the lead in the fourth quarter as kicker Rob Bironas got a 45-yard field goal.  Pittsburgh would tie the game as kicker Jeff Reed made a 32-yard field goal. With time running out, the Steelers drove down the field again, and lost the ball to a rare Hines Ward fumble, allowing the Titans to run the game into overtime.

In overtime, the Steelers won the cointoss and never relinquished the ball.  In the end, Pittsburgh emerged victorious as Reed nailed the game-winning 33-yard field goal.

With the win, the Steelers began their season at 1–0.

This also marked the first time that the Steelers were able to win against Collins.

Week 2: at Chicago Bears

Coming off their season-opening win over the Titans, the Steelers flew to Soldier Field for a Week 2 interconference duel with the Chicago Bears.  In the first quarter, Pittsburgh struck first as quarterback Ben Roethlisberger completed a 1-yard touchdown pass to tight end Matt Spaeth.  However, in the second quarter, the Bears answered with quarterback Jay Cutler completing a 6-yard touchdown pass to tight end Kellen Davis.

Pittsburgh would regain their lead in the third quarter as Roethlisberger got a 2-yard touchdown run, but in the fourth quarter, two missed field goals from kicker Jeff Reed would lead to Cutler's 7-yard touchdown pass to wide receiver Johnny Knox and kicker Robbie Gould's 44-yard field goal.

With the loss, the Steelers fell to 1–1.

Week 3: at Cincinnati Bengals

Following a tough road loss against the Bears, the Steelers flew to Paul Brown Stadium for a Week 3 AFC North duel with the Cincinnati Bengals.  Pittsburgh would strike first in the first quarter with kicker Jeff Reed's 19-yard field goal and quarterback Ben Roethlisberger's 27-yard touchdown pass to running back Willie Parker.  The Steelers would add onto their lead in the second quarter as Reed made a 34-yard field goal.  The Bengals would close out the half with kicker Shayne Graham's 34-yard field goal.

Cincinnati would creep closer in the third quarter as cornerback Johnathan Joseph returned an interception 30 yards for a touchdown (with a failed PAT), yet Pittsburgh answered with Roethlisberger's 1-yard touchdown run.  However, in the fourth quarter, the Bengals took the lead with running back Cedric Benson's 23-yard touchdown run (with a failed 2-point conversion) and quarterback Carson Palmer's 4-yard touchdown pass to wide receiver Andre Caldwell (with a successful 2-point conversion pass to running back Brian Leonard).  The Steelers tried to rally, but Roethlisberger's last-second hail mary pass was incomplete, preserving the defeat.

With the loss, Pittsburgh fell to 1–2 and 3rd place in the AFC North.  This would also become the team's first 1–2 start since 2006.

Wide receiver Hines Ward (4 receptions, 82 yards) would become the 21st player in NFL history to surpass 800 career receptions and 10,000 receiving yards.

Week 4: vs. San Diego Chargers

Hoping to snap a two-game losing skid, the Steelers went home, donned their throwback uniforms, and prepared for a Week 4 Sunday night duel with the San Diego Chargers. Pittsburgh got off to a fast start in the opening half with running back Rashard Mendenhall (filling in for the injured Willie Parker) helping out the cause on a 1-yard touchdown run in the first quarter, followed by quarterback Ben Roethlisberger's 19-yard touchdown pass to running back Mewelde Moore.  The Steelers would carry their fast start into the second quarter as Mendenhall got a 2-yard touchdown run.

In the third quarter, Pittsburgh picked up where they left off, with Roethlisberger completing a 6-yard touchdown pass to tight end Heath Miller.  The Chargers would get on the board with quarterback Philip Rivers' 3-yard touchdown pass to tight end Antonio Gates.  In the fourth quarter, San Diego began to play catch-up with a special teams play. Fullback Jacob Hester would strip return specialist Stefan Logan of the ball and go 41 yards for a touchdown. The Steelers came right back with a trick play, as Moore completed a 6-yard touchdown pass to Miller. However, the Chargers would slash away at the Steelers' lead, with Rivers completing a 30-yard touchdown pass to Gates and a 13-yard touchdown pass to wide receiver Chris Chambers. Pittsburgh would answer the call with kicker Jeff Reed booting a 46-yard field goal, followed by linebacker James Harrison causing a sack and a fumble. It would allow linebacker James Farrior to recover the fumble and secure the victory.

With the win, not only did the Steelers improve to 2–2, but they also extended their regular-season home-game winning streak over San Diego to 13-straight.

Mendenhall would have a career night, with 29 carries for 165 yards, in addition to his two rushing touchdowns.

Week 5: at Detroit Lions

Following a close victory over the Chargers, the Steelers traveled to Ford Field for a Week 5 interconference duel with the 1–3 Detroit Lions.  Despite the Lions getting the opening score of the first quarter with a 46-yard field goal from kicker  Jason Hanson, Pittsburgh would answer with running back Rashard Mendenhall's 7-yard touchdown run.  Afterwards, Detroit closed out the opening period with Hanson making another 46-yard field goal.  In the second quarter, the Steelers would deliver a big strike with quarterback Ben Roethlisberger completing a 15-yard touchdown pass to tight end Heath Miller.  Even though the Lions came right back with cornerback Williams James returning an interception 38 yards for a touchdown, Pittsburgh effectively replied with Roethlisberger's 17-yard touchdown pass to wide receiver Hines Ward.

In the third quarter, the Steelers would add onto their lead as Roethlisberger threw to rookie wide receiver Mike Wallace on a 47-yard touchdown pass.  Detroit tried to rally in the fourth quarter as quarterback Daunte Culpepper found wide receiver Dennis Northcutt on a 25-yard touchdown pass, but Pittsburgh's defense made a crucial stand with three-straight sacks (courtesy of linebacker LaMarr Woodley, cornerback William Gay, and linebacker Lawrence Timmons), followed by cornerback Ike Taylor swatting away the Lions' last hope from a hail-mary pass.

With the win, the Steelers improved to 3–2.

Week 6: vs. Cleveland Browns

Coming off their road win over the Lions, the Steelers went home for a divisional match with the Cleveland Browns.  After a scoreless first quarter, Pittsburgh came out striking in the second quarter as quarterback Ben Roethlisberger completed an 8-yard touchdown pass to tight end Heath Miller and a 52-yard touchdown pass to wide receiver Hines Ward.  The Browns immediately struck back as wide receiver Joshua Cribbs returned a kickoff 98 yards for a touchdown. Pittsburgh would close out the half with a 32-yard field goal from kicker Jeff Reed.

Cleveland tried to catch up as quarterback Derek Anderson completed a 1-yard touchdown pass to fullback Lawrence Vickers, yet the Steelers answered with a 2-yard touchdown run from running back Rashard Mendenhall.  Pittsburgh would then close the game out in the fourth quarter with Reed kicking a 39-yard field goal.

With their 12th-straight win over the Browns, the Steelers improved to 4–2.  With the Ravens' loss to the Vikings, and the Bengals' loss to the Texans that same week, the Steelers are now tied with the Bengals at the top of the AFC North.

Week 7: vs. Minnesota Vikings

Coming off their divisional win over the Browns, the Steelers stayed at home for a Week 7 interconference duel with the 6–0 Minnesota Vikings.  Pittsburgh got the game's opening score late in the first quarter with kicker Jeff Reed nailing a 39-yard field goal.  The Vikings would answer in the second quarter with a 2-yard touchdown run from running back Adrian Peterson, yet the Steelers struck back with Ben Roethlisberger completing a 40-yard touchdown pass to rookie wide receiver Mike Wallace.

Both teams would swap field goals in the third quarter, with Reed booting a 27-yard field goal and Vikings kicker Ryan Longwell making an 18-yard field goal.  In the fourth quarter, Pittsburgh defense came up with a huge play as defensive end Brett Keisel forced a fumble off of Vikings quarterback Brett Favre, allowing linebacker LaMarr Woodley to return the fumble 77 yards for a touchdown.  However, Minnesota immediately struck back as wide receiver Percy Harvin returned a kickoff 88 yards for a touchdown. The Steelers' defense came up big again as linebacker Keyaron Fox returned a Favre interception 82 yards for a touchdown.

With the huge win, Pittsburgh went into their bye week at 5–2 while Minnesota dropped to 6–1.

Week 8: BYE

Week 9: at Denver Broncos

Coming off their bye week, the Steelers flew to INVESCO Field at Mile High for a Week 9 Monday night duel with the Denver Broncos.  Pittsburgh would trail in the first quarter as the Broncos closed out the game's opening drive with kicker Matt Prater booting a 40-yard field goal, yet the Steelers would answer in the second quarter as safety Tyrone Carter (who filled in for safety Ryan Clark) returned an interception 48 yards for a touchdown.

Denver would answer in the third quarter as quarterback Ben Roethlisberger was sacked by defensive end Kenny Peterson, which caused a fumble.  The ball would be picked up by linebacker Robert Ayers and returned 54 yards for a touchdown.  Afterwards, Pittsburgh would answer with Roethlisberger completing a 3-yard touchdown pass to wide receiver Hines Ward.  In the fourth quarter, the Steelers would pull away as Roethlisberger connected with rookie wide receiver Mike Wallace on a 25-yard touchdown pass, followed completing a 3-yard touchdown pass to Ward.

With the upset victory, Pittsburgh improved to 6–2.

Week 10: vs. Cincinnati Bengals

Coming off their impressive Monday night road win over the Broncos, the Steelers went home for a divisional rematch with the Cincinnati Bengals with first place in the division on the line.

In the first quarter, Pittsburgh would deliver the game's first strike with a 28-yard field goal from kicker Jeff Reed.  However, the Bengals would immediately answer as running back Bernard Scott returned a kickoff 96 yards for a touchdown (with a failed PAT).  The Steelers would regain the lead in the second quarter as Reed got a 33-yard and a 35-yard field goal.

Cincinnati would respond in the third quarter as kicker Shayne Graham made a 23-yard and a 32-yard field goal.  Pittsburgh would tie the game in the fourth quarter with Reed nailing a 34-yard field goal. However, the Bengals would pull away as Graham booted a 32-yard and a 43-yard field goal.

With the upset loss, the Steelers fell to 6–3.

Week 11: at Kansas City Chiefs

After the loss to the Bengals, the Pittsburgh Steelers journeyed to Arrowhead Stadium for a match with the Chiefs.

At the start of the first quarter Chiefs RB Jamaal Charles returned a kickoff from their own 3-yard line to the Steelers' endzone for a touchdown. In the second quarter Pittsburgh rallied as PK Jeff Reed made a 36-yard field goal, then QB Ben Roethlisberger made an 8-yard touchdown pass to WR Hines Ward, and then Roethlisberger passed to TE Heath Miller 10 yards for a touchdown.

In the third quarter the Chiefs tied the game when QB Matt Cassel made a 21-yard touchdown pass to TE Leonard Pope, and then kicker Ryan Succop made a 22-yard field goal. In the fourth quarter Pittsburgh took the lead as QB Ben Roethlisberger made an 8-yard touchdown pass to RB Rashard Mendenhall, until the Chiefs came back to tie the game as QB Matt Cassel made a two-yard touchdown pass to Jamaal Charles to put the game in overtime. Afterwards, it was Kansas City that took the win when kicker Ryan Succop made a 22-yard field goal.

With the shocking loss, the Steelers fell to 6–4.

Week 12: at Baltimore Ravens

Following a loss to the 3–7 Kansas City Chiefs the previous week, the Steelers traveled to M&T Bank Stadium for another divisional game. Ben Roethlisberger, who suffered a concussion in the previous week's overtime loss, was the designated 3rd (emergency) quarterback. Backup Charlie Batch also was hurt in that game, which left 2nd-year QB Dennis Dixon, who previously had one pass in his NFL career, to start.

The Steelers received the opening kickoff, but went three-and-out. On the ensuing possession, the Ravens drove down the field with ease, capping off their drive with a touchdown run by Willis McGahee. In the second quarter, Dixon hit WR Santonio Holmes on a play-action pass for a 33-yard TD, tying the game. The Ravens answered on the following drive, with a 52-yard strike from Joe Flacco to Mark Clayton, setting up a 10-yard touchdown pass to Derrick Mason.

In the third quarter, on the Ravens opening possession, Mark Clayton made a 9-yard reception but fumbled the ball and it was recovered by Tyrone Carter. The Steelers drove, but were held to a field goal by Jeff Reed. Later in the 4th quarter, Joe Flacco was sacked by Lawrence Timmons and fumbled the ball, recovered by the Steelers near midfield. The drive resulted in a 24-yard run on a QB option by Dixon, giving the Steelers their first lead of the night. On the Ravens next possession Joe Flacco completed a pass to Derrick Mason for 17 yards, and then found Ray Rice for a 44-yard reception, setting the Ravens up inside the Steeler 10 yard line with less than 2 minutes left. Billy Cundiff tied the game with a 24-yard field goal. On the following Steeler possession, Dennis Dixon was nearly intercepted by Lardarius Webb. The Steelers were forced to punt, giving the ball back to the Ravens with about 1:30 left in the game. The Ravens managed to drive to the Steeler 40 yard line, where their drive stalled. With the clock counting inside 10 seconds left and no timeouts, the field goal team managed to get into formation, and get the kick off. The 56 yard attempt by Billy Cundiff was dead center, but about 2 yards short, sending the game into overtime.

In overtime, the Steelers won the coin toss and got the ball, but were forced to punt. The Ravens, also forced to punt deep in their own territory, gave the ball to Pittsburgh around the Steeler 40 yard line. On a 3rd and 5, Dennis Dixon threw an interception to LB Paul Kruger, who returned the ball 26 yards to the Steeler 28 yard line. Already in field goal range, the Ravens ran the ball down to the Pittsburgh 11 yard line where Billy Cundiff made a 29-yard field goal to win the game.

With their second consecutive overtime loss, the Steelers fell to 6–5.

Week 13: vs. Oakland Raiders

Coming off back-to-back losses in overtime, the Steelers looked to turn things around.  With the return of Ben Roethlisberger to action, the Steelers hosted the 3–8 Oakland Raiders.

The Steelers would open with a 33-yard field goal by Jeff Reed.  Oakland responded with a 48-yarder by Sebastian Janikowski, and both teams were tied 3–3 as the 2nd quarter began.  Roethlisberger found Santonio Holmes for a 34-yard TD pass to begin the 2nd quarter.  Oakland would put 3 points on the board after a 43-yard field goal halfway through the quarter, and the Steelers headed to Halftime with a 10–6 lead.

There followed a scoreless third quarter, and in the fourth Pittsburgh's defensive struggles were exploited by the Raiders, who were able to find the end zone three times. Bruce Gradkowski would find Chaz Schilens for a 17-yard TD pass with 8:21 remaining in the game, giving Oakland their first lead of the game, 13–10. Pittsburgh responded just one minute later with a 3-yard TD run by Rashard Mendenhall.  But Oakland would not be stopped.  Gradkowski hit Louis Murphy for a 75-yard TD pass with 5:28 remaining, and the Raiders went up 20–17. Roethlisberger would make an 11-yard TD pass to Hines Ward with 1:56 remaining and the Steelers would regain the lead 24–20.  All that was needed was for the Steelers' defense to keep Oakland out of the end zone and they would win. But with nine seconds remaining, Gradkowski would once again find Louis Murphy open in the end zone for an 11-yard TD pass and the Raiders would win 27–24.

The game would mark the fifth time in six games that the Steelers suffered a 4th quarter collapse, and the second time in three weeks Pittsburgh had fallen to an opponent with a losing record. At the conclusion of the game, the Steelers had allowed seven plays of 40 yards or longer in their last four games (they only gave up two such plays in 2008).

With the loss, the Steelers fell to 6–6.

Week 14: at Cleveland Browns

After losing four games in a row, the Steelers went to Cleveland for a Thursday Night divisional match.

In windy, below-freezing conditions, Browns kicker Phil Dawson hit a 29-yard field goal in the 1st quarter to give the Brown's an early 3–0 lead.  He would kick another 29-yarder in the 2nd quarter, and Chris Jennings had a 10-yard touchdown run to put the Browns up 13–0. Jeff Reed kicked a field goal before the half to put the Steelers on the board. They would go into halftime down 13–3.

Jeff Reed would kick another field goal in the 3rd quarter to bring them within a touchdown. However, a scoreless 4th quarter by both teams led the Browns to their first win against the Steelers since 2003, becoming only the fourth team in NFL history to be at least 10 games under .500 and defeat the defending Super Bowl champions.

With another loss, the Steelers fell to 6–7.  It was the first time since the 1987 New York Giants that a defending Super Bowl Champion team suffered five consecutive losses.

Week 15 vs. Green Bay Packers

The Steelers would come into the game riding a five-game losing streak. They also no longer controlled their playoff destiny, needing to win their final three games of the season, and also losses by other AFC teams to have a chance for a wild card.

Pittsburgh would strike on their first play of the game when Ben Roethlisberger hit a wide-open Mike Wallace for a 60-yard TD pass.  Green Bay would answer with an 83-yard strike from Aaron Rodgers to Greg Jennings for a TD.  The Steelers would cap the 1st quarter with a 2-yard TD run by Rashard Mendenhall.  In the 2nd quarter, QB Aaron Rodgers was able to scramble out of the pocket for a 14-yard TD run.  Ben Roethlisberger would hit Mewelde Moore for a 10-yard TD pass in the final seconds of the 1st Half and the Steelers would take a 21–14 lead into halftime with them.

The 2nd half got off to a slow start for both teams.  Jeff Reed would kick a 37-yard field goal, the only scoring of the 3rd quarter.  In the 4th quarter, it became a shootout between both quarterbacks.  Aaron Rodgers would hit Jermichael Finley for an 11-yard TD pass.  The Steelers answered with a 34-yard field goal, but would lose the lead for the first time in the game when Ryan Grant rushed for a 24-yard score, putting Green Bay up 28–27.  The Steelers would once again answer with a 43-yard field goal, but Aaron Rodgers would complete a 24-yard TD pass to James Jones and follow it with a successful 2-point conversion attempt.  The Steelers, down 36–30, would get the ball back with just 2 minutes left in the game.  With just 3 seconds remaining, Ben Roethlisberger would hit Mike Wallace in the left sideline of the endzone (in a TD pass that resembled the Super Bowl-winning catch by Santonio Holmes back in February) and the extra point was good, giving the Steelers a last-second 37–36 win over the Packers.

Ben Roethlisberger would finish with a record-setting game, going 29/46 for 503 yards and 3 TD passes.  He would become the first quarterback in Steelers' franchise history to have a 500-yard game.

With the last second win, the Steelers would move to 7–7.

These two teams would meet again a year later in Super Bowl XLV with the Steelers falling short 25-31.

Week 16: vs. Baltimore Ravens

Coming off a win over the Green Bay Packers, the Steelers hosted the Baltimore Ravens in their second matchup of the season.  There was much at stake, as the Ravens needed to win to get into the playoffs, and the Steelers needed to win in order to keep their faint playoff hopes alive as well.

Jeff Reed booted 26-yard and 39-yard field goals and Billy Cundiff kicked a 27-yarder to give the Steelers a 6–3 lead as they started the second quarter.  The Steelers offense would start rolling, scoring on a 4-yard run by Rashard Mendenhall. Joe Flacco responded with a 30-yard TD pass to Todd Heap. But in the final seconds of the first half, Ben Roethlisberger found Santonio Holmes for a 24-yard TD pass, and the Steelers carried a 20–10 lead with them into halftime.

Baltimore controlled the third quarter.  Flacco hit Heaps for a seven-yard TD pass and Cundiff kicked a 35-yard field goal to tie the game. The fourth quarter saw both defenses step up.  Jeff Reed kicked a 38-yard field goal with 5:25 remaining to give the Steelers a 23–20 lead.  Baltimore had one more chance to score, but rookie defensive end Ziggy Hood recorded his first career sack and then recovered Flacco's fumble on a fourth and 10 play from the Steelers' 39 with 2:27 remaining. An apparent interception thrown by Roethlisberger was negated by an "illegal block in the back" penalty and the Steelers ran out the clock, securing the win.

The win not only prevented Baltimore from clinching a wild card, but kept Pittsburgh's playoff hopes alive as well. They would need to win at Miami in their season finale and also need other teams to lose.

With the win, the Steelers moved to 8–7.

Week 17: at Miami Dolphins

The Steelers' defense averted a fourth-quarter collapse while sending two of Miami's quarterbacks to the sideline, including third-string Pat White, who was hit in the head and carried off the field on a stretcher.

In the first quarter, Ben Roethlisberger hit Santonio Holmes for a five-yard TD on their opening possession. Miami responded quickly, when Chad Henne threw an 11-yard pass to Lex Hilliard. A few minutes later, Roethlisberger found Mike Wallace wide open for a 54-yard TD. In the second quarter, Miami's Dan Carpenter kicked a 25-yard field goal and Pittsburgh's Jeff Reed kicked a 22-yard field goal to give the Steelers a 17–10 halftime lead.

The Steelers put the only points on the board in the third quarter, scoring on a three-yard TD pass to Heath Miller. The Steelers carried a 20–10 lead into the fourth quarter, but that would not be enough to allow them to play conservatively.  Following Reed's 21-yard field goal to start the final quarter, Miami rallied back with the help of fourth-string quarterback Tyler Thigpen. Brian Hartline rushed for a 16-yard TD run and Thigpen threw a 34-yard TD pass to Davone Bess, drawing the Dolphins back within a field goal of tying the game. Former Steelers linebacker Joey Porter recovered a fumble by Roethlisberger at the Steelers' 13-yard line with 6 minutes remaining, but Thigpen was intercepted at the two-yard line. The Steelers drove 83 yards in the final minutes, ending the game with a 33-yard field goal, and a 30–24 win.

The Steelers' win brought their season-ending winning record to 9–7. The injury-ridden Dolphins had been eliminated from post-season contention minutes earlier when the Texans defeated the Patriots (ensuring that the Dolphins would not play Super Bowl XLIV in their own home). For four hours, the Steelers waited for the Ravens–Raiders game to end, but Baltimore won and got the No. 6 AFC seed, thus preventing the Steelers from attempting to repeat their world title.

Post-season summary

The Pittsburgh Steelers battled many injuries throughout the year. Troy Polamalu only played in five games the entire season, Ben Roethlisberger missed a critical divisional game against the Ravens due to a concussion, Chris Kemoeatu missed four games, Travis Kirschke missed five games, and Aaron Smith missed 10 games.

The Steelers beat four eventual playoff-bound teams: the Green Bay Packers, the Minnesota Vikings, the Baltimore Ravens, and the San Diego Chargers. The Steelers' offense gained 369.2 yards a game (263.1 coming through the air, and 106.1 coming on the ground). The Steelers' defense allowed their opponents to compile 305.5 average yards per game, and allowed only an average of 89.3 yards a game on the ground.  Ben Roethlisberger was able to set team passing records in the following categories: completion percentage, completions, attempts, and yards. The Steelers defense compiled 47 sacks, and the team finished with 41 total touchdowns and 3 defensive touchdowns.

However, five of the Steelers seven losses came from blowing leads in the fourth quarter.   Had they won those games, they would have finished with a 14–2 record.  Five of their losses came consecutively, losing to the Bengals, Chiefs, Ravens, Raiders, and Browns.  They finished 2–4 against teams with losing records.  Pittsburgh’s special team allowed eight straight kickoff/punt returns for touchdowns.  The Steelers also allowed for a 100-yard rusher in Week 16 against Baltimore (Ray Rice, 141-yards), snapping their 33-game streak of not allowing one.

Ben Roethlisberger was voted the team’s Most Valuable Player and Offensive Player of the Year.  He was the first quarterback in Steelers’ franchise history to throw for 4,000 yards in a season, throwing 26 touchdowns.  Rookie of the Year honors went to receiver Mike Wallace, who had 39 receptions for 756-yards and 6 touchdowns.  Rashard Mendenhall was awarded Most Improved Player, finishing with 1,108 yards rushing and 8 touchdowns.  Defensive Player of the Year went to James Harrison, who finished the season with 79 tackles, 11 sacks, and 3 forced fumbles.

James Harrison and Casey Hampton were voted to the Pro Bowl, Harrison as a starter and Hampton as a reserve.  Lamar Woodley and Heath Miller were added to the Pro Bowl roster as replacements for players who couldn't attend.  Ben Roethlisberger, was the first alternate among AFC QBs, but due to a shoulder injury he turned down the opportunity to replace Tom Brady.

Lamar Woodley was named to the Associated Press (AP) All-Pro second team.  James Harrison received the 5th-most votes among outside linebackers in the AP balloting, leaving him just off the second team.  However, it was later discovered that Brian Cushing of the Houston Texans, who was named to the AP's second-team at outside linebacker, had tested positive for a banned drug during the season.  The AP chose to re-open balloting and Harrison and Lance Briggs of the Chicago Bears leapfrogged Cushing and made the second-team.  Other Steelers receiving AP All-pro votes were tackle Willie Colon (1 vote, thirteenth among offensive tackles), nose tackle Casey Hampton (1 vote, sixth among defensive tackles), tight end Heath Miller (1 vote, fifth among tight ends) and placekicker Jeff Reed (1 vote, fourth among kickers).  Harrison was named a second team All-Pro by the Sporting News.

References

External links
 2009 Pittsburgh Steelers season at Pro Football Reference 
 2009 Pittsburgh Steelers season statistics at jt-sw.com 
 2009 Pittsburgh Steelers season at ESPN
 2009 History Of Pittsburgh Steelers Football Game

Pittsburgh
Pittsburgh Steelers seasons
Pitts